The Arab Cup U-20 is an international football competition organised by the Union of Arab Football Associations, contested by the U-20 national teams in the Arab world. The teams come from CAF and AFC. Some non-Arab nations, such as Senegal or Uzbekistan, have also been invited on occasion.

History 
The competition was created in 1983 as the Palestine Cup of Nations for Youth; the first edition was held in Morocco, which Iraq won after beating Saudi Arabia in the final. After a 22-year long hiatus, in 2011 the competition returned as the Arab Cup U-20 under the auspices of the UAFA.

Results

Successful national teams

Participating nations

Notes

See also 
 FIFA Arab Cup
 2002 Palestine Solidarity Tournament
 Palestine Cup of Nations
 Arab Cup U-17

References

External links
 كأس العرب تحت 20 سنة - kooora.com
 Palestine Cup of Nations for Youth - rsssf.com
 Palestine Cup of Nations for Youth - goalzz.com

 
Union of Arab Football Associations competitions
Under-20 association football
Recurring sporting events established in 1983
Recurring sporting events established in 2011